Leslie John Colwill (born January 1, 1935) is a Canadian retired ice hockey right winger who played 69 games in the National Hockey League for the New York Rangers during the 1958–59 season. The rest of his career, which lasted from 1955 to 1960, was mainly spent in the minor Western Hockey League.

Career statistics

Regular season and playoffs

External links
 

1935 births
Living people
Brandon Regals players
Canadian ice hockey right wingers
Ice hockey people from Saskatchewan
New York Rangers players
Regina Pats players
Saskatoon Quakers players
Saskatoon Regals/St. Paul Saints players
Vancouver Canucks (WHL) players